Rondeletia is a  genus of flowering plants in the family Rubiaceae. It is endemic to the Neotropics. There are around 160 species.

Rondeletia odorata is widely grown as an ornamental. Several other species are also known in cultivation.

Rondeletia was named in 1753 by Linnaeus in his book, Species Plantarum. This genus name commemorates the French physician Guillaume Rondelet (1507-1566).

The type species for Rondeletia is Rondeletia americana. It is little known and rarely collected.

The circumscription of Rondeletia has varied greatly from one author to another. Rogiera, Arachnothryx, and a few others have been included in Rondeletia by some authors, but molecular phylogenetic studies have shown that they are closer to Guettarda than to Rondeletia, and they are now recognized as separate genera. Even with these segregates removed, Rondeletia remains polyphyletic and will be substantially revised after further phylogenetic study.

Species
Species include:

Stevensia ovatifolia was previously placed in the genus.

References

External links
 Rondeletia At: Search Page At: World Checklist of Rubiaceae At: Index by Team At: Projects At: Science Directory At: Scientific Research and Data At: Kew Gardens
 Rondeletia At: Plant Names At: IPNI
 Rondeletia In: Volume 1 Of: Species Plantarum At: Titles beginning with "S" At: Biodiversity Heritage Library
 CRC World Dictionary of Plant Names: R-Z At: Botany & Plant Science At: Life Science At: CRC Press
 Rondeletia At:Index Nominum Genericorum At: References At: NMNH Department of Botany At: Research and Collections At: Smithsonian National Museum of Natural History
 At: List of Genera At: Rubiaceae At: List of families At: Families and Genera in GRIN At: Queries At: GRIN taxonomy for plants
 Rondeletia At: Rondeletieae At: Cinchonoideae In:··· Embryophyta At: Streptophytina At: Streptophyta At: Viridiplantae At: Eudaryota At: Taxonomy At: UniProt

 
Rubiaceae genera